XHFCT-FM was a noncommercial radio station in Tomatlán, Jalisco. It broadcast on 96.3 FM and was known as La Tropicosta.

History
The station received its permit in 2000, though its roots dated to a temporary radio station on 100.1 that operated for 18 months from August 22, 1995, to 1997. It was well-received, and an application was made for a fully permitted radio station.

On May 22, 2019, the Federal Telecommunications Institute voted to deny a renewal application for XHFCT-FM, as well as the associated transition of its permit to a social community concession. In processing XHFCT's renewal, it found that the noncommercial station had sold advertising time in violation of its permit.

References

Radio stations in Jalisco
Community radio stations in Mexico
Defunct radio stations in Mexico
Radio stations established in 2000
Radio stations disestablished in 2009
2000 establishments in Mexico
2009 disestablishments in Mexico